Gornja Bitnja (in older sources Bitinje) is a small settlement on the right bank of the Reka River in the Municipality of Ilirska Bistrica in the Inner Carniola region of Slovenia.

Turn Mansion
There is a 17th-century mansion in the settlement known as Turn Mansion or Turn Radlšek Mansion. It stands on a hill above the village, and it is an elongated rectangular building with two towers that projecting from it. It dates from the 17th century but was remodeled in the 18th century. There is a pond before the entrance.

References

External links 

 Gornja Bitnja on Geopedia

Populated places in the Municipality of Ilirska Bistrica